"Many Happy Hangovers to You" is a single written by Johnny MacRae and originally recorded by American country music artist Jean Shepard.  Released in January 1966, it was the first single from the album Many Happy Hangovers.  The song reached #13 on the Billboard Hot Country Singles chart.

Chart performance

References 

1966 singles
Jean Shepard songs
Song recordings produced by Ken Nelson (American record producer)
1966 songs
Capitol Records singles